A list of books and essays about Sergio Leone:

Leone, Sergio
Bibliography